The  is a kind of Chinese astrology and a handy approximation of the Four Pillars of Destiny.

The Four Pillars of Destiny is too complicated and difficult for everyday use, consequently this approximation was introduced in Taiwan and Hong Kong.

Contents and Definitions 

The births with their birthday's Sexagenary cycles (in Chinese calendar)
甲子 , 乙丑 , 丙寅 , 丁卯 , 戊辰 , 己巳 , 庚午 , 辛未 , 壬申 , 癸酉
They have the common  terms. The KūBōs(We often call ) are Dog 戌 and Pig 亥. In the line we have no 戌 nor 亥.

甲戌 , 乙亥 , 丙子 , 丁丑 , 戊寅 , 己卯 , 庚辰 , 辛巳 , 壬午 , 癸未
The KūBōs are Monkey 申 and Rooster 酉.

甲申 , 乙酉 , 丙戌 , 丁亥 , 戊子 , 己丑 , 庚寅 , 辛卯 , 壬辰 , 癸巳
The KūBōs are Horse 午 and Goat 未.

甲午 , 乙未 , 丙申 , 丁酉 , 戊戌 , 己亥 , 庚子 , 辛丑 , 壬寅 , 癸卯
The KūBōs are Dragon 辰 and Snake 巳.

甲辰 , 乙巳 , 丙午 , 丁未 , 戊申 , 己酉 , 庚戌 , 辛亥 , 壬子 , 癸丑
The KūBōs are Tiger 寅 and Rabbit 卯.

甲寅 , 乙卯 , 丙辰 , 丁巳 , 戊午 , 己未 , 庚申 , 辛酉 , 壬戌 , 癸亥
The KūBōs are Rat 子 and Ox 丑.

Attentions
The name Dosei Jin has no relationship with Saturn. The each KūBōs of 戌 and 亥 consists of 辛丁戊 and 戊甲壬; their main element is 戊, belonging to the Soil or Earth in Wu Xing.

Chinese astrology